The Good Dinosaur is a 2015 American computer-animated adventure film produced by Pixar Animation Studios and distributed by Walt Disney Studios Motion Pictures. The film was directed by Peter Sohn (in his feature directorial debut) and produced by Denise Ream. The screenplay was written by Meg LeFauve, who also wrote the film's story with Sohn, Bob Peterson, Kelsey Mann, and Erik Benson. It stars the voices of Raymond Ochoa, Jack Bright, Steve Zahn, Sam Elliott, Anna Paquin, A. J. Buckley, Jeffrey Wright, and Frances McDormand. The film explores an alternate history where non-avian dinosaurs never became extinct, following a young, timid Apatosaurus named Arlo (Ochoa), who meets an unlikely human friend named Spot (Bright) while traveling through a dangerous and mysterious landscape in order to return home, after being washed downriver by a rainstorm.

Development of The Good Dinosaur began with Peterson and Sohn working on the film in 2009 when the former came up with the idea of exploring what dinosaurs represent in the present day and how they are represented in stereotypes. The project was officially announced in 2011, with the release date, plot, director and co-director, producer, and other small details being revealed. During its production, the team encountered various problems, which led to multiple story revisions, as well as changing directors and voice cast. To create a realistic background for the film, the team traveled to various American landscapes, which were later incorporated into the film. Arlo is designed to look distinct and relatable, in order to connect with audiences. In addition, the film pays homage to Western genre in its themes, character representation, and western North American landscapes. Mychael and Jeff Danna composed the film's musical score, marking Pixar's first film to be scored by two composers.

The Good Dinosaur premiered on November 10, 2015, in Paris, and was released in the United States on November 25 in the Disney Digital 3D and RealD 3D formats. The film garnered generally positive reviews from critics for its animation and themes, though its storytelling was not considered to be up to Pixar's standards. It grossed $332.2 million on a $175–200 million budget, becoming Pixar's first box-office bomb. The film was nominated for Best Animated Feature Film at the 73rd Golden Globe Awards, but lost to Inside Out, another Pixar film released in the same year.

Plot

In an alternate history, the asteroid that would have caused the extinction of the dinosaurs 65 million years ago passes safely over Earth. Millions of years later, Apatosaurus corn farmers Henry and Ida have three children: Libby, Buck, and Arlo. While his successful siblings are allowed to "make their mark" (a mud-print on the family's corn silo), Arlo's timid nature makes tasks difficult for him. Henry attempts to give Arlo a sense of purpose by putting him in charge of guarding their silo, and helps him set a trap. It captures a feral caveboy, but Arlo cannot bring himself to kill him, and sets him free. Disappointed, Henry takes Arlo to track the caveboy, leading them into a ravine. Henry saves Arlo from a flash flood before being killed by debris.

Without his father, Arlo shoulders more of the workload. He spots the same caveboy inside the silo and blaming him for his father's death, chases him into a river, where both are swept downstream. Arlo is knocked unconscious by a rock, and awakens to find himself miles from home. As he tries to return, his leg is caught by a boulder. The next day, Arlo wakes to find his leg has been freed. The caveboy appears with food, and leads Arlo to a berry tree. The caveboy then fends off a large snake, amazing Arlo, and impressing Forrest Woodbush, a nearby eccentric Styracosaurus who wants to keep the boy. He forces Arlo to compete with him to give the boy a name he will respond to, and Arlo wins when he calls the boy "Spot". Arlo and Spot bond as Arlo laments his lost family, and Spot reveals that his own parents are both dead.

Later, when a storm strikes, Arlo runs away in fear and loses the riverbank he has been following home. The next morning, Arlo wakes to find Spot at his side. They are noticed by a band of pterodactyls, who appear to be conducting a rescue operation but turn out to be savagely carnivorous. When the pterodactyls try to eat Spot, Arlo and Spot flee, happening upon a pair of Tyrannosaurus siblings named Nash and his sister Ramsey, who drive off the pterodactyls. Nash, Ramsey, and their father Butch have lost their herd of longhorns, so Arlo offers Spot's help in sniffing them out. The group locates the herd, but Butch recognizes the work of cattle rustlers. Arlo and Spot lure the four rustler Velociraptors into the open, allowing Butch and his family to attack. After the rustlers have been driven off, Arlo joins the Tyrannosaurus in driving the cattle south. Later, he sees the familiar mountain peaks of his homeland in the distance, and leaves with Spot to return home. Along the way, they encounter an adult feral caveman in the distance. Spot is intrigued, but Arlo dissuades him and they continue on. As another storm approaches, the pterodactyls return, attack, and carry Spot away. Arlo falls off a cliff and becomes entangled in vines, being knocked unconscious as a rock strikes his head. Arlo has a vision of his father freeing him and leading him home. Arlo instead resolves to save Spot, making the vision of Henry proud of his son before it fades away. The vision invigorates Arlo with refound strength, as he frees himself from the vines and finds and attacks the pterodactyls, who have cornered Spot in the river. Arlo and Spot together plunge the pterodactyls into the water, where they are swept helplessly downstream. When a landslide causes a giant wave, Arlo leaps into the water to rescue Spot, and the two are swept away toward a waterfall. Arlo protects Spot as they go over the falls, and carries him to shore.

As they near Arlo's home, the two are approached by the caveman and his entire family, who show great interest in Spot. With great reluctance, Arlo pushes Spot to join this new adoptive family, and the two of them share a tearful goodbye. Arlo finally arrives home to his mother and siblings, and makes his mark on the silo between those of his mother and father.

Voice cast

 Raymond Ochoa as Arlo, a young Apatosaurus
 Jack McGraw as Young Arlo
 Jack Bright as Spot, a 7-year-old human caveboy who befriends Arlo
 Sam Elliott as Butch, a Tyrannosaurus who runs a "ranch" filled with prehistoric "longhorns"
 Anna Paquin as Ramsey, Butch's daughter
 A. J. Buckley as Nash, Butch's son
 Steve Zahn as Thunderclap, a Nyctosaurus and the leader of a gang of pterodactyls
 Mandy Freund as Downpour, a Caulkicephalus who is a member of Thunderclap's flock
 Steven Clay Hunter as Coldfront, a Ludodactylus who is a member of Thunderclap's flock
 Jeffrey Wright as Poppa Henry, the father of the Apatosaurus family
 Frances McDormand as Momma Ida, the mother of the Apatosaurus family
 Marcus Scribner as Buck, Arlo's older brother
 Ryan Teeple as Young Buck
 Maleah Padilla as Libby, Arlo's older sister
 Peter Sohn as Forrest Woodbush, a Styracosaurus who has various animals perched on his horns
 Dave Boat as Bubbha, the leader of a gang of Velociraptor rustlers
 Carrie Paff as Lurleane, a Velociraptor who is a member of Bubbha's pack
 John Ratzenberger as Earl, a Velociraptor who is a member of Bubbha's pack
 Calum Mackenzie Grant as Pervis, a Velociraptor who is a member of Bubbha's pack

Production

Development
In 2009, when Bob Peterson came up with the idea about the dinosaurs represent in the present day, Peterson and Peter Sohn started working on the film. The film's first release date of November 27, 2013, was first announced on June 20, 2011. The film was announced as The Untitled Pixar Movie About Dinosaurs at the D23 Expo on August 21, 2011, which revealed the plot, director and co-director, producer, and other small details. On April 24, 2012, Pixar officially revealed the film's title as The Good Dinosaur.

The filmmakers wanted to explore what dinosaurs represent in the present day, and how they are represented in stereotypes. Peterson stated: "It's time to do a movie where you get to know the dinosaur, what it's really like to be a dinosaur and to be with a dinosaur." Peterson said that his inspiration of the film came from the World's Fair childhood visit where he gets impressed by "dinosaur animatronics."

On the film's title, Sohn stated, "The title is deceptively simple. It has more meaning than it seems." He additionally explained: "Arlo has a lot of issues when he's born. He's fearful and he's weak and he's disconnected from the family because of these issues and he feels like he's not worthy, and so he finds a way to become worthy."

In April 2012, Pixar announced that the film's release date had been shifted from November 27, 2013, to May 30, 2014, with Walt Disney Animation Studios' Frozen taking its place. On August 9, 2013, it was announced at the D23 Expo that Lucas Neff, John Lithgow, Frances McDormand, Neil Patrick Harris, Judy Greer, and Bill Hader had joined the cast of the film.

Revisions
By mid 2013, Peterson was removed from the film due to story problems. Peterson, who could not solve the film's third act, was absent from the D23 Expo where Sohn and producer Denise Ream presented footage from the film. Peterson moved on to another project he developed at Pixar while Ream replaced producer John Walker, who left to work on Disney's own Tomorrowland. John Lasseter, Lee Unkrich, Mark Andrews, and Sohn stepped in temporarily to work on various sections of the film. In September 2013, The Good Dinosaur was pushed back from May 30, 2014, to November 25, 2015 (the scheduled release date for Pixar's Finding Dory). According to Ream, the primary reason for the rescheduling was because "the story was not working, period, full stop, it just was not where it needed to be." In November 2013, due to the delay, Pixar laid off 67 employees of its 1,200-person workforce, following the closure of Pixar Canada a month before, when about 80 employees had been laid off, officially to refocus Pixar's efforts at its main headquarters.

In August 2014, Lithgow revealed in an interview that the film had been dismantled and "completely reimagined" and that he was expected to rerecord his role in the next month while mentioning that McDormand was still part of the film. In October 2014, Sohn was announced as the new director of the film. In November 2014, it was reported that new elements had been added to the story, such as treating nature as the film's antagonist.

In June 2015, it was announced that the majority of the cast had been revised. Of the original cast, only McDormand retained her role in the film. It was revealed that Neff had been replaced by Raymond Ochoa, and Lithgow had been replaced by Jeffrey Wright. Arlo's three siblings, to be voiced by Harris, Hader, and Greer had been cut down to a single brother named Buck, voiced by Marcus Scribner, and later, a sister named Libby, voiced by Maleah Padilla. It was also confirmed that the farmer aspect was still part of the film.

Design and setting

The filmmakers wanted nature to be the antagonist for the main character Arlo. Ream noted "Nature can overcome anything, including a massive dinosaur." In order to achieve the needed realism, the film's team traveled to the American Northwest, spending time in Jackson Hole, Wyoming, Juntura, Oregon, and southern Montana. Production designer Harley Jessup stated that the film "has a fantastic variety of landscapes," which ranged "from the Jackson Valley and the Tetons to the amazing geysers and waterfalls in Yellowstone," as the filmmakers "studied the grasslands of Montana and the Red Desert" and used them to incorporate into the film. To use the landscapes that they had experienced, the filmmakers used data from the U.S. Geological Survey, and satellite images from Google Earth. The geographical data provided a foundation that the team then built on. According to supervising technical director Sanjay Bakshi, this gave Sohn "the freedom to shoot in any direction he wanted to make the world feel big and real." In addition, The Good Dinosaur features three-dimensional, volumetric clouds. In previous Pixar films, clouds have been "painted" onto the sets. Light and photography director Sharon Calahan described the storm clouds "are almost like a villain in the film", and appeared "in almost every scene." Calahan also noted "These particular clouds can be rendered and we can light them, which we've never been able to properly do before."

According to the filmmakers, the environments and landscapes in the film are not photo-realistic, they are just detailed in a way that advanced technology and style decisions allow. In terms of animating Arlo, animators Rob Thompson and Kevin O'Hara went to a zoo and shot video of elephants in motion. A system where Arlo's head goes up and his chest goes down when his hips goes up, was therefore created. To get an idea of the scale of Arlo, a complete full-size model was built out of card and foam core. In total The Good Dinosaur took up 300TB of server space, ten times as much space as Monsters University (2013).

Arlo was designed so that the audience could identify with him and be able to see the "boy" inside the dinosaur. Since The Good Dinosaur is set in a world in which dinosaurs never became extinct, they were instead able to evolve. Herbivores like Arlo and his family become farmers, and carnivores like the T. rex become ranchers. Because they are meant to be reminiscent of cowboys, when the T. rex run, their lower bodies mimic a galloping horse, while their upper bodies have the feel of a riding cowboy. To help inspire Butch's physical look and performance, the filmmakers looked at classic film cowboys such as characters portrayed by Clint Eastwood and Jack Palance.

Music

The film's score was composed by Mychael Danna and his brother, Jeff, replacing Thomas Newman, who was originally attached to score the film when it was set to be directed by Peterson. It marks the first Pixar film to be scored by two composers. Danna was approached by Sohn and Ream due to his score for Life of Pi, which won an Academy Award. Having a lot of work, he invited his brother as a co-writer. Walt Disney Records released the soundtrack on November 20, 2015.

Release
Prior to the film's release on November 19, 2015, The Good Dinosaur: Dino Crossing, a mobile arcade-style game, was released. The game, later also available on Kindle Fire, was no longer available, according to Common Sense Media; while a figure of Spot and Power Discs of Arlo, Ramsey, Nash, and Butch was also released for Disney Infinity 3.0.

The Good Dinosaur was theatrically released on November 25, 2015. Before the rescheduling from 2014 to 2015, a Monsters University short film titled Party Central was set to accompany the film but was instead shown with the theatrical release of Disney's Muppets Most Wanted. In April 2015, it was announced that a new Pixar short, Sanjay's Super Team, directed by Sanjay Patel, would be shown in front of The Good Dinosaur instead. The film received an exclusive run at the Grand Rex in Paris a week before its U.S. and European premiere.

Home media
Walt Disney Studios Home Entertainment released The Good Dinosaur on Blu-ray, DVD, and digital download on February 23, 2016. Blu-ray bonus features include Sanjay's Super Team, audio commentary, behind-the-scenes featurettes, deleted scenes, and the "Hide and Seek" short promotional clip. In 2019, The Good Dinosaur was released on 4K Ultra HD Blu-ray.

In its first week, The Good Dinosaur sold 686,656 DVDs and 726,042 Blu-rays as the most sold film on both formats in the United States. That same week, The Good Dinosaur topped the Nielsen VideoScan First Alert chart, which tracks overall disc sales, as well as the dedicated Blu-ray sales chart. Overall, The Good Dinosaur sold 1.8 million DVDs and 1.3 million Blu-rays, adding them up to get a total of 3.1 million copies, and made $64.2 million through home media releases. It was the eighth best-selling film of 2016.

Reception

Box office
The Good Dinosaur grossed $123.1 million in the United States and Canada and $209.1 million in other territories, for a worldwide total of $332.2 million against a production budget of $175–200 million, which with added marketing costs of $350 million, caused Walt Disney Studios to lose $85 million unadjusted for inflation, and the film to be considered Pixar's first box-office bomb.

Released alongside Creed and Victor Frankenstein, as well as the wide releases of Brooklyn, Spotlight, and Trumbo, on November 25, 2015, The Good Dinosaur made $9.8 million on its first day, including $1.3 million from Thursday night previews. It went on to take second place at the opening weekend with $56 million from 3,749 theaters. Its second weekend saw the box office drop by 60% to $15.5 million, and The Good Dinosaur grossed another $10.3 million the following weekend. The Good Dinosaur completed its theatrical run in the United States and Canada on April 7, 2016.

Worldwide, The Good Dinosaur made $29.8 million in its opening weekend in 39 markets, including 8 significant countries. Unlike the US, where it had the benefit of the Thanksgiving weekend, it did not have the same benefit internationally. Rather, its release date was designed to set it up to run through the December holiday. The top countries were the United Kingdom ($7.8 million), Mexico ($6.7 million), France ($6 million), Argentina ($3.8 million), and Russia ($3.7 million). Of those, it opened at No. 1 in Mexico, Argentina, and Russia. The film's top international markets were the United Kingdom ($22.5 million), France ($18 million), Japan ($14.9 million), Mexico ($13.2 million), and Brazil ($11.8 million).

Critical response
  Audiences polled by CinemaScore gave the film an average grade of "A" on an A+ to F scale.

Kenneth Turan of the Los Angeles Times described it as "antic and unexpected as well as homiletic, rife with subversive elements, wacky critters and some of the most beautiful landscapes ever seen in a computer animated film." Manohla Dargis of The New York Times felt the film "has a few things on its mind, but its tone is overwhelmingly playful, not hectoring." Joe Morgenstern of The Wall Street Journal opined that "As Pixar productions go, this one isn't a groundbreaker, but it's heartfelt and endearing, as well as visually splendiferous, and kids will love it for sure." Justin Chang of Variety wrote "Clever and cloying by turns, it’s a movie that always seems to be trying to evolve beyond its conventional trappings, and not succeeding as often as Pixar devotees have come to expect". Many of the reviewers praised the sophistication of its nearly photorealistic backgrounds.

Christopher Orr of The Atlantic felt it to be the studio's first film explicitly targeted towards children, though it is "by no means a bad movie [...] It's a simple story, well-told." Mark Feeney, writing for The Boston Globe, felt similarly, deeming it a "very middling movie [...] The Good Dinosaur generally features a sort of sentimentality and emotional reductiveness that make it seem meant for small children as no previous Pixar movie has." The Washington Post Stephanie Merry dubbed it "a nice, conventional story, but it's not Pixar-level imaginative." Richard Roeper, for the Chicago Sun-Times, felt it "one strange, aggressively gross and dark adventure [...] Inconsistent and weird, The Good Dinosaur is second-level Pixar all the way." Michael Rechtshaffen of The Hollywood Reporter panned its "disappointingly derivative" screenplay. Mark Kermode of The Guardian says "But however much it may delight on a scene-by-scene basis, The Good Dinosaur never comes together as a coherent whole, a crucial flaw for a film by Pixar, which has always put story first."

Accolades

References

External links

 Official website at Pixar.com
 Official U.S. website at Disney.com
 
 
 

2010s adventure films
2010s American animated films
2010s children's animated films
2010s English-language films
2015 3D films
2015 directorial debut films
2015 films
2015 computer-animated films
3D animated films
American 3D films
American adventure comedy films
American alternate history films
American buddy films
American children's animated adventure films
American children's animated comedy films
American children's animated fantasy films
American computer-animated films
Animated buddy films
Animated coming-of-age films
Animated films about dinosaurs
Animated films about friendship
Animated films set in prehistory
Annie Award winners
Anthropomorphic dinosaurs
Films about cavemen
Animated films about cavemen
Films directed by Peter Sohn
Films scored by Jeff Danna
Films scored by Mychael Danna
Pixar animated films
Walt Disney Pictures animated films